The 1984 Benson & Hedges Championships was a men's tennis tournament played on indoor carpet courts at the Wembley Arena in London in England that was part of the 1984 Volvo Grand Prix. The tournament was held from 5 November through 11 November 1984. Third-seeded Ivan Lendl won the singles title and the accompanying $50,000 first-prize money.

Finals

Singles
 Ivan Lendl defeated  Andrés Gómez 7–6, 6–2, 6–1
 It was Lendl's 3rd singles title of the year and the 42nd of his career.

Doubles
 Ivan Lendl /  Andrés Gómez defeated  Pavel Složil /  Tomáš Šmíd 6–2, 6–2

References

External links
 ITF tournament edition details

Benson and Hedges Championships
Wembley Championships
Benson and Hedges Championships
Benson and Hedges Championships
Benson and Hedges Championships
Tennis in London